Tromatobia ovivora is a species of ichneumon wasp in the family Ichneumonidae.

References

Further reading

 

Pimplinae
Insects described in 1821